HSG Düsseldorf was a German handball team from Düsseldorf.

External links
 official website

Sport in Düsseldorf
German handball clubs